László Fazekas (born 15 October 1947) is a Hungarian former football player who played the third most international games for the Hungarian national team. Fazekas played in the 1978 and the 1982 World Cup. In the latter tournament, he scored two long shots in the 10–1 win over El Salvador at the Estadio Manuel Martínez Valero stadium. He also competed for Hungary at the 1968 Summer Olympics.He spent his entire career in Hungary with Újpesti Dózsa, having won a total of 9 championships, before moving to Belgium, where he became a popular character, as well, having played for Royal Antwerp before finishing his active career at St.Truidense. He decided to stay in Belgium after the end of his active career, where he still lives today, and remained in football as manager of several teams, including Royal Antwerp.

References

1947 births
Living people
1978 FIFA World Cup players
1982 FIFA World Cup players
Hungarian footballers
Hungary international footballers
Hungarian football managers
Royal Antwerp F.C. managers
Olympic footballers of Hungary
Olympic gold medalists for Hungary
Footballers at the 1968 Summer Olympics
Footballers from Budapest
Association football forwards
Újpest FC players
Royal Antwerp F.C. players
Sint-Truidense V.V. players
Olympic medalists in football
S.C. Eendracht Aalst managers
Medalists at the 1968 Summer Olympics
K.R.C. Zuid-West-Vlaanderen managers
Belgian Pro League players
Royale Union Saint-Gilloise managers
Racing Jet Wavre managers